Indian films have been released in overseas markets since the latter half of the 1940s. Some of these have had significant commercial success and been nominated for awards.

The first Indian film to have a worldwide release was from 1952 (Aan, directed by Mehboob Khan). In the 1950s, Indian films saw success in a handful of regions. At the time, the most significant market for Indian films was the Soviet Union, gaining considerable success and occasionally leading to Indian-Soviet co-productions. In the 1950s and 1960s, the Indian film industry also expanded in China and East Africa, which, after the Soviet Union, accounted for some of the largest shares of overseas revenues. Since the collapse of the Soviet Union in 1991, the most significant market has been the South Asian diaspora. China, India's geographic neighbour and the world's second largest film market (after the United States), has seen growing success for Indian films since the beginning of the 21st century.

History
The first Indian film to have a commercial release in an overseas territory was Dharti Ke Lal (1946), directed by Khwaja Ahmad Abbas and based on the Bengal famine of 1943. It was released in the Soviet Union in 1949. The first Indian film to have a worldwide release in many countries was Aan (1952), directed by Mehboob Khan, and starring Dilip Kumar and Nimmi. It was subtitled in 17 languages and released in 28 countries, including the United Kingdom, United States, France, and Japan, earning a considerable profit from overseas. Mehboob Khan's later Academy Award nominated Mother India (1957) was an unprecedented success in overseas markets, including Europe, Russia, the Eastern Bloc, French territories, and Latin America.

In the 1950s, Bollywood and Egyptian films were generally more popular than Hollywood films in East Africa. By the 1960s, East Africa was one of the largest overseas export markets for Indian films, accounting for about 20-50% of global earnings for many Indian films.

Soviet Union

Up until the 1980s, the largest overseas market for Indian films was the Soviet Union. After Dharti Ke Lal, the first Indian film to become a blockbuster at the Soviet box office was Awaara (1951), directed by Raj Kapoor and written by Khwaja Ahmad Abbas, released in the Soviet Union in 1954. Indian films had the strongest presence in the Soviet foreign blockbuster charts for four decades. 300 Indian films were released in the Soviet Union, most of which were Bollywood films. Among the foreign films that sold more than 20 million tickets in the Soviet Union, 50 were Indian films, the highest from any nation, compared to 41 Hollywood films. Indian films were routinely released with hundreds of prints in the Soviet Union, with the most popular Indian films releasing with more than a thousand prints there.

The highest-grossing Indian film in the Soviet Union was Disco Dancer (1982), written by Rahi Masoom Raza and starring actor Mithun Chakraborty. In terms of footfalls, the only Indian films estimated to have sold 100million tickets overseas were Awaara and Disco Dancer in the Soviet Union. Indian films were very popular in Russia at the time, routinely opening to packed houses. However, the Soviet Union collapsed in 1991, bringing an end to Indian cinema's largest overseas market at the time. The decline of Russian cinema in the post-Soviet era led to Indian films largely disappearing from Russian cinemas by the mid-1990s.

China

In China, some of the Indian films to gain commercial success there during the 1970s–1980s included Awaara, Tahir Hussain's Caravan (1971), Noorie (1979), and Disco Dancer.

After Indian films declined in the country, it took decades before Tahir Hussain's son Aamir Khan opened up the Chinese market for Indian films in the early 21st century. His Academy Award nominated Lagaan (2001) became the first Indian film to have a nationwide release there. When 3 Idiots released in China, the country was only the 15th largest film market, partly due to China's widespread pirate DVD distribution at the time. However, it was the pirate market that introduced 3 Idiots to most Chinese audiences, becoming a cult hit in the country. It became China's 12th favourite film of all time, according to ratings on Chinese film review site Douban, with only one domestic Chinese film (Farewell My Concubine) ranked higher. Aamir Khan gained a large growing Chinese fanbase as a result. By 2013, China grew to become the world's second largest film market (after the United States), paving the way for Aamir Khan's Chinese box office success, starting with Dhoom 3 (2013).

PK (2014) was the first Indian film to collect 2 billion overseas, and Dangal (2016) is the first Indian film to exceed 10 billion and $100 million overseas, including ¥1.299 billion from China. Dangal became the 16th highest-grossing film in China, the fifth highest-grossing non-English language film worldwide, and the highest-grossing non-English foreign film in any market. His next film, the Zaira Wasim starrer Secret Superstar (2017), broke Dangals record for the highest-grossing opening weekend by an Indian film, cementing Aamir Khan's status as a superstar in China, and as "a king of the Chinese box office". Salman Khan's Bajrangi Bhaijaan and Irrfan Khan's Hindi Medium also became blockbusters in China during early 2018.

South Asian diaspora
Since the 1990s, the largest overseas market for Indian cinema has been the South Asian diaspora. South Asians in the United Kingdom were the first major diaspora market, with Indian film releases in the United Kingdom dating back to the 1950s.

The diaspora market grew significantly in the early 1990s, with the popularity of Shah Rukh Khan largely credited for popularizing the trend of Indian films targeting overseas NRI audiences. After some overseas success from the Shah Rukh Khan starrer Darr (1993) and the Madhuri Dixit and Salman Khan starrer Hum Aapke Hain Koun (1994), the breakthrough came with Dilwale Dulhania Le Jayenge (1995), starring Shah Rukh Khan as an NRI. Afterwards, Indian films followed a trend of releasing worldwide with an increasing number of screens. Shah Rukh Khan starrer Dil Se.. (1998) was the first Indian film to enter the United Kingdom's top 10 box office charts. Diaspora audiences in the United States and United Kingdom accounted for 55% of overseas ticket sales for films such as Kuch Kuch Hota Hai (1998) and Taal (1999). In 2000, the overseas export market for Indian films was worth  annually. Naseeruddin Shah starrer Monsoon Wedding (2001) crossed  overseas, followed by Shah Rukh Khan starrer My Name Is Khan (2010) and then Aamir Khan starrer 3 Idiots (2009) in 2011.

Overseas gross figures
The following list of films is sorted in terms of US dollars (not adjusted for inflation), the standard currency used to measure box office performance for overseas markets.

Currency conversions to Indian rupees are also given as reference points.

Overseas gross adjusted for inflation

Timeline of overseas gross records

Gross records in global markets

Major overseas markets

China

Soviet Union

United States and Canada

United Arab Emirates

United Kingdom

Japan

Malaysia

Highest overseas gross by year

International co-productions
The following films are international co-productions between Indian and non-Indian film studios. Films shot primarily in Indian languages are included on the lists above, as well as listed below. Films shot primarily in non-Indian languages are excluded from most of the lists above, but included on the list below.

See also
 100 Crore Club
 1000 Crore Club
 List of highest-grossing films in China
 List of highest-grossing films in India
 List of highest-grossing Indian films
 List of most expensive Indian films
 List of highest-grossing films in the Soviet Union
 Lists of Hindi films
 Lists of highest-grossing films

Notes

References

Indian
Lists of Indian films